The Litosomini are a tribe of weevils in the subfamily Dryophthorinae.  Species of Sitophilus, which include the grain weevils, are important cosmopolitan, stored products pests.

Genera
Wikispecies includes the following genera:
 Anogelia
 Autonopis
 Brenthidogenia
 Calandrites
 Calandrotopus
 Catapyges
 Crepidotus
 Daisya Anderson, 2003
 Dichthorrhinus
 Dyspnoetus
 Eucalandra Faust, 1899
 Ganae Pascoe, 1885
 Gypsophorus
 Laocalandra
 Laodaria
 Laogenia
 Laostates
 Melchus Lacordaire, 1866
 Microspathe Faust, 1899
 Myocalandra
 Neocalandra
 Neophrynoides O'Brien & Wibmer, 1982
 Oliabus
 Paramorphorrhinus
 Periphemus
 Sitophilus Schönherr, 1838
 Symmorphorhinus
 Tatiotimus
 Toxorhinus Lacordaire, 1866
 Tryphetus

References

External links
 BioLib.cz: Litosomina Lacordaire, 1865 (retrieved 10 January 2020)
 
 

Dryophthorinae
Polyphaga tribes